Jitse van der Veen (2 November 1928 – 19 September 1976) was a Dutch swimmer. He competed at the 1952 Summer Olympics in the 100 m backstroke event, but failed to reach the final.

References

1928 births
1976 deaths
Dutch male backstroke swimmers
Olympic swimmers of the Netherlands
Swimmers at the 1952 Summer Olympics
Sportspeople from Leeuwarden
20th-century Dutch people